Photographs is the debut release of Lakes, lead singer and guitarist Seth Roberts' newest ensemble after his first group Watashi Wa disbanded in 2004. Itas first performed at the Cornerstone festival in 2006, where L the bandlso sold a limited number (200 copies) of the EP.  The first public release was on August 3, 2006 in a digital format, as an Absolute Punk exclusive.  The band and label maintain the physical release date of September 5, 2006 as the official release date.

Reception

Photographs garnered warm reviews from most critics, typically citing Robert's strong voice as a highlight of the album.

Track listing

Notes
 Percussion on "Indian Lover" by Jermey Limpic
 Vocals on "Photographs" by Aaron Marsh ( appears courtesy of Copeland /The Militia Group)
 Vocals on "White Flag" by Mike Herrera (appears courtesy of MXPX/Side One Dummy)
 Bass on "Photographs," Stand up Bass on "Indian Lover," and group vocals on "White Flag" by Roger Tompkins

Personnel
 Seth Roberts – vocals, Guitar
 Jason Massey – vocals, Guitar, drums, Piano, Keyboards
 Jonathan Russo – Drums, Percussion
 Erik Brunner – Bass

Production
 Producers: Seth Roberts and Jason Massey
 Engineers: Seth Roberts, Jason Massey, Jonathan Russo, Scott Silleta
 Mixing: Matt Malpass
 Mastering: Mike Fossenkemper

References

External links
 Artist Biography on Label's site
 Photographs EP release page The Militia Group
 Absolute Punk profile

2006 EPs